The top division of team wrestling in Germany, is the Bundesliga (German: Bundesliga-Ringen). Every year since 1964, championships have been held by Bundesliga-Ringen.

Each time a team competes, then a number of the matches will be contested by rules of Greco-Roman wrestling, and the rest of the matches will be fought by the rules of Freestyle wrestling.

The Vorrunde consists of 20 teams (2010–11) competing for a slot in the play-offs, which consists of quarter-finals and semi-finals.

The finals are held around the month of February. The finals consist of one set of matches (in different weight classes) during an evening, and another set of matches on another evening.

Teams 2021–22 

The 2021–22 season is slated to begin in September 2021.

References

Wrestling competitions
Wrestling
Wrestling in Germany